Milton Omar Núñez García (born October 30, 1972) is a retired Honduran footballer.

Nuñez played a few seasons in Honduras before moving abroad to play for Comunicaciones in Guatemala and for Nacional in Uruguay. He then briefly appeared for PAOK in the Superleague Greece and for Sunderland in the Premier League.

Club career

Early career
Born in Sambo Creek, Honduras, Nuñez played a few seasons in Honduras with Deportes Progreseño and Real España before moving abroad to play for Guatemalan side Comunicaciones and for Uruguayan club Nacional.

PAOK
In 1999, Nuñez joined Greek club PAOK.

Sunderland
In March 2000, Nuñez signed for Premier League side Sunderland. The transfer fee paid to former club Nacional was reported as £1.6 million plus a possible further £1 million in bonuses.

One theory surrounding his signing is that Peter Reid, who was the manager when Núñez was brought to the Stadium of Light, thought that he had signed Núñez's strike partner at PAOK, Adolfo Valencia, and not Núñez himself. Núñez himself claimed in an interview that Sunderland had thought that Valencia and Nunez's international team-mate Eduardo Bennett, both of whom were a similar height and build, were the same player, and had watched both of them play for PAOK and Honduras respectively assuming they had seen the same player twice. In the confusion, they had ended up signing Núñez by mistake, with the diminutive forward being the only Honduran player at PAOK. Sunderland later went to court over the transfer as Nunez was owned by Uruguayan third tier team Uruguay Montevideo at the time of his move to Wearside, although he never played for them. Nunez stayed in England for two years before returning to Nacional, after playing just once for Sunderland against Wimbledon in the league and Luton Town in the League Cup. He later played for Pachuca and Necaxa.

Back in Honduras
Núñez returned to his native Honduras in 2004 and he signed for Olimpia in summer 2007 and in June 2008 he rejoined Marathón before moving abroad again.

Guatemala
In 2009, Núñez crossed the border to play for Guatemalan side Jalapa and then joined USAC for the 2010 Clausura championship, along with Selvin Motta and former national team goalkeeper Paulo César Motta. In June 2010, he rejoined Comunicaciones before joining Universidad SC the following year.

In February 2013, a historic fine was imposed on a Guatemalan football club after fans of Heredia racially abused USAC's black striker Núñez.

Núñez left USAC in 2017 before joining third tier team Deportivo Ayutla in September 2018.

Victoria
In June 2019, Nunez signed a contract with Victoria, where he would play alongside his son, also named Milton.

International career
Tyson made his debut for Honduras in a May 1994 Miami Cup match against El Salvador and has earned a total of 86 caps, scoring 33 goals, making him third on Honduras' national team's all-time goalscorers list.

He has represented his country in 24 FIFA World Cup qualification matches and played at the 1995, 1997, 1999, 2001,2003 and 2005 UNCAF Nations Cups as well as at the 1996, 2000 and 2005 CONCACAF Gold Cups.

His final international was an October 2008 FIFA World Cup qualification match against Jamaica.

Personal life
Nuñez received the nickname Tyson due to his resemblance to former heavyweight boxing champion Mike Tyson.

Career statistics

Club
Sources:

International goals
Source:

Honours and awards

Club
Comunicaciones
 Liga Nacional de Fútbol de Guatemala (3): 1994–95,  1996–97, 1997–98

Nacional
 Uruguayan Primera División (2): 1998, 2001

Marathón
 Liga Profesional de Honduras (2): 2004–05 A, 2008–09 A

Real Espana
 Liga Profesional de Honduras: 2006–07 C

Olimpia
 Liga Profesional de Honduras: 2007–08 C

Country
Honduras
 Copa Centroamericana: 1995

Individual
 Liga Nacional de Fútbol de Guatemala Top Goalscorer: 1994-95

References

External links
 
 

1972 births
Living people
People from Atlántida Department
Association football forwards
Honduran footballers
Honduras international footballers
1996 CONCACAF Gold Cup players
2000 CONCACAF Gold Cup players
2001 UNCAF Nations Cup players
2003 UNCAF Nations Cup players
2005 UNCAF Nations Cup players
2005 CONCACAF Gold Cup players
Real C.D. España players
Comunicaciones F.C. players
Club Nacional de Football players
PAOK FC players
Uruguay Montevideo players
Sunderland A.F.C. players
C.F. Pachuca players
Club Necaxa footballers
C.D. Marathón players
C.D. Olimpia players
Deportivo Jalapa players
Universidad de San Carlos players
Deportivo Ayutla players
C.D. Victoria players
Liga Nacional de Fútbol Profesional de Honduras players
Uruguayan Primera División players
Super League Greece players
Premier League players
Liga MX players
Liga Nacional de Fútbol de Guatemala players
Honduran expatriate footballers
Expatriate footballers in Guatemala
Expatriate footballers in Uruguay
Expatriate footballers in Greece
Expatriate footballers in England
Expatriate footballers in Mexico
Copa Centroamericana-winning players
Central American Games gold medalists for Honduras
Central American Games medalists in football